Lundin's Neck also written as Lundean's Nek, is a pass across the Witteberge range, an outlier of the Drakensberg, at the extreme southern tip of Lesotho. It is situated in the Eastern Cape province of South Africa, on the regional road R393, between Barkly East and Tele Bridge.

Mountain passes of the Eastern Cape